Statistics of UAE Football League for the 2000–01 season.

Overview
It was contested by 12 teams, and Al-Wahda FC (Abu Dhabi) won the championship.

League standings

Goalscorers

22 goals
 Mohammed Salem Al-Enazi (Al-Wahda S.C.C.)

14 goals
 Farhad Majidi (Al Wasl SC)
 Baba Adamo (Al-Shabab)
 Rachid Benmahmoud (Al-Ahli)

13 goals
 Joël Tiéhi (Al Jazira Club)

References
United Arab Emirates - List of final tables (RSSSF)

UAE Pro League seasons
United
1